is the 34th single by Japanese singer Yōko Oginome. Written by Chika Ueda, the single was released on June 21, 1995, by Victor Entertainment.

Background and release
The song was used as the theme song of the NHK drama special , which starred Oginome. The B-side, "If You Love Me Now (Aishisa ni Sarawarete)", was the opening theme of the Fuji TV drama special .

"Shiawase e no Jikan" peaked at No. 86 on Oricon's singles chart and sold over 4,000 copies.

Track listing

Charts

References

External links

1995 singles
Yōko Oginome songs
Japanese-language songs
Japanese television drama theme songs
Victor Entertainment singles